Johann Adam von Zahlheim was a mayor of Vienna.

References 

Mayors of Vienna